Ralph R. B. von Frese is an American geophysicist at the Ohio State University who identified the Wilkes Land mass concentration in Antarctica in collaboration with Laramie Potts.

In 1969, Frese graduated B.A. cum laude from Park College in physics, mathematics, and German. He earned M.Sc. degrees in physics (1973) and geophysics (1978) and a Ph.D. in geophysics (1980) from Purdue University. He has taught at OSU since 1982.

He and Potts used gravity measurements by NASA's GRACE satellites to identify a 200-mile (300 km) wide mass concentration.  This mass anomaly is centered within a larger ring-like structure visible in radar images of the land surface beneath the Antarctic ice cap. This combination led these researchers to speculate that it may have resulted from a large impact event.

References

External links
Ralph von Frese webpage via OSU

Year of birth missing (living people)
Living people
American geophysicists
Ohio State University faculty
Park University alumni
Purdue University alumni